Ambala Cantonment Assembly constituency is one of the 90 assembly seats of Haryana. Ambala city is a part of Ambala district. Anil Vij is current MLA.

Members of Legislative Assembly

References

External links 
 Ambala City

Ambala
Ambala